The United Kingdom of Great Britain and Northern Ireland, competing as Great Britain, participated in the inaugural Paralympic Games in 1960 in Rome. The 1960 Paralympics, now considered to have been the first Paralympic Games, were initially known as the ninth Stoke Mandeville Games, Games for athletes with disabilities founded in Great Britain in 1948.

Great Britain fielded the second largest delegation at the 1960 Games (after Italy's), with 31 competitors (18 men and 13 women) in archery, athletics, snooker, swimming, table tennis and wheelchair basketball. It also fielded by far the greatest number of female athletes (13), whereas all other countries fielded four or less (with the exception of Austria, which sent seven). All British competitors won medals in every event they entered, putting Great Britain second on the medal table with 20 gold, 15 silver and 20 bronze. Britain's first ever Paralympic gold medal was won by Margaret Maughan, in archery.

Medalists

Medals by sport

References

See also

 Great Britain at the 1960 Summer Olympics

Nations at the 1960 Summer Paralympics
1960
Paralympics